John Banks (October 17, 1793 – April 3, 1864) was an Anti-Masonic member of the U.S. House of Representatives from Pennsylvania.

John Banks was born near Lewisburg, Pennsylvania.  He studied law, was admitted to the bar and commenced practice in Juniata County, Pennsylvania, in 1819.  He moved to Mercer County, Pennsylvania, and continued the practice of law.

Banks was elected as an Anti-Masonic candidate to the Twenty-second, Twenty-third, and Twenty-fourth Congresses and served until his resignation on March 31, 1836. He became judge of the Berks judicial district from May 1836 until he resigned to become State treasurer of Pennsylvania in 1847.  He resumed the practice of law in Reading, Pennsylvania, where he died in 1864.  Interment in Reading's Charles Evans Cemetery.

References

The Political Graveyard

1793 births
1864 deaths
People from Lewisburg, Pennsylvania
Anti-Masonic Party members of the United States House of Representatives from Pennsylvania
19th-century American politicians
Burials at Charles Evans Cemetery
Pennsylvania lawyers
Politicians from Reading, Pennsylvania
Pennsylvania state court judges
State treasurers of Pennsylvania
19th-century American judges
19th-century American lawyers